Drăsliceni is a commune in Criuleni District, Moldova. It is composed of three villages: Drăsliceni, Logănești and Ratuș.

History
The "For the Nation and Country Party", now called the Greater Moldova Party, was formed on May 5, 2007 in Ratuș.

References 

Communes of Criuleni District